Fuzzy differential equation are general concept of ordinary differential equation in mathematics defined as differential inclusion for non-uniform upper hemicontinuity convex set with compactness in fuzzy set.
 for all  .

First order fuzzy differential equation 
A first order fuzzy differential equation with real constant or variable coefficients 

 

 such that .

Application 
It is useful for calculating Newton's law of cooling, compartmental models in epidemology and multi-compartment model.

Linear systems of fuzzy differential equations 
A system of equations of the form 

Fuzzy partial differential equations 
A fuzzy differential equation with partial differential operator is 
for all .

Fuzzy fractional differential equation
A fuzzy differential equation with fractional differential operator is 

  for all  where  is a rational number.

References 

 Mathematics
 Fuzzy logic
 Differential equations